Vanessa Bernauer (born 23 March 1988) is a Swiss football midfielder, currently playing for Roma in Serie A. She previously played for VfL Wolfsburg and BV Cloppenburg of the Frauen Bundesliga, FC Zürich in Switzerland's Nationalliga A and Levante UD in Spain's Primera División.

Club career 
In Germany, Bernauer caught the attention of several clubs around the Bundesliga by scoring a 45-yard goal for Cloppenburg against Munich. Her performances with Cloppenburg would earn the admiration of major club Wolfsburg, who signed Bernauer in 2014.

At Wolfsburg, Bernauer would go on to win one league title and three German cups. In Europe, Bernauer would reach two Champions League finals and one semi-final during her stay with the club. The 2016 Champions League final saw Bernauer substituted in the 73rd minute, meaning she missed out on the chance to take a penalty in Wolfsburg's eventual shootout defeat to Lyon. The 2018 Champions League final saw Bernauer miss the game after picking up a major knee injury in the spring of 2018, while on international duty with Switzerland.

Wolfsburg decided to let Bernauer go while the midfielder was recovering from a major knee injury, so Bernauer then signed for A.S. Roma in the summer of 2018. Her first season with the Italian club saw Bernauer played in an advanced midfield role, but she struggled to meet expectations as the veteran playmaker of a young Roma team. The Italian club then made a series of high-profile midfield signings in the summer of 2019, but chose to keep Bernauer at the club. That meant Bernauer got to play among more experienced teammates during the 2019-20 Serie A season.

Among those new teammates was the major signing of midfielder Manuela Giugliano, for who Bernauer agreed to give up the Roma number 10 jersey at the club. Bernauer then took the Roma number 5 shirt and settled into a new role as a ball-winning midfielder, finding consistency and good form from 2019 onwards. In Bernauer's third season with Roma, and just five years after she had missed out on the chance to take a penalty in Wolfburg's Champions League final loss, Bernauer stepped up to score the winning penalty in Roma's shootout victory over AC Milan in the 2021 Coppa Italia final. On 20 July 2021, Bernauer signed a contract extension that tied her to Roma until the summer of 2022.

International career 
She debuted for the Switzerland national team in February 2006. She appeared for her country at the 2015 FIFA Women's World Cup and at UEFA Women's Euro 2017, while she was also part of the Switzerland squad that won the 2017 Cyprus Cup.

In April 2021, Bernauer was part of the Switzerland squad that qualified for the UEFA Women's Euro 2022 tournament via the playoffs.

Style of play 
Vanessa Bernauer is a tough-tackling midfielder, who frequently recovers the ball for her team and plays a key role in attacking transition. She retains the vision and ability to find a key pass anywhere inside the opposition half, as well as holding a potent shot that can make Bernauer a long-range goal threat. Bernauer is able to carry out any number of creative or defensive roles in midfield.

Honours

FC Zürich

 Nationalliga A: Winner (3) 2007–2008, 2008–2009, 2009–2010
 Swiss Women's Cup: Winner (1) 2006-2007

Levante UD

 COTIF: Winner (3) 2011, 2012, 2013
 Pyrénées Cup: Winner (1) 2012
 Sport Mundi Tournament: Winner (1) 2010

Wfl Wolfsburg

 Bundesliga: Winner (1) 2016-2017
 DFB Pokal: Winner (3) 2014-2015, 2015-2016, 2016-2017
Roma
Coppa Italia: Winner (1) 2020-21

References

External links
Profile at Txapeldunak.com 

1988 births
Living people
Swiss women's footballers
Primera División (women) players
Levante UD Femenino players
VfL Wolfsburg (women) players
Expatriate women's footballers in Germany
Expatriate women's footballers in Spain
Swiss expatriate women's footballers
Swiss expatriate sportspeople in Germany
Swiss expatriate sportspeople in Spain
Switzerland women's international footballers
2015 FIFA Women's World Cup players
Swiss Women's Super League players
FC Zürich Frauen players
Women's association football midfielders
A.S. Roma (women) players
Expatriate women's footballers in Italy
Swiss expatriate sportspeople in Italy
Serie A (women's football) players
Footballers from Zürich
UEFA Women's Euro 2017 players